Bambi Woods (born July 12, 1955) is an American former pornographic actress and exotic dancer best known for her appearance as the title character in the 1978 film Debbie Does Dallas. Her meteoric success in the Golden Age of Porn and later disappearance intrigued adult industry writers and caused interest in her whereabouts, and a myth about her having met a sordid fate several years after her heyday began to be accepted as fact.

Biography

Woods was known for her first role as the eponymous character of "Debbie" in the 1978 feature adult film Debbie Does Dallas. She received top billing and a photo of her in a bogus uniform was prominently advertised on theater marquees where she was billed as a "former Dallas Cowgirl." Woods had previously tried out for the real Dallas Cowboys Cheerleaders but never made the squad; in the trailer for Debbie Does Dallas, Woods insists that none of her experiences were used for the completely fictional storyline, though she surmised that they could have happened. The partners with whom she had unsimulated sexual intercourse in the film included Robert Kerman and others drawn from the small group of veteran performers who appeared in most hard-core films made in the U.S. during that era.

Woods said her involvement in adult films was arranged by a female friend to whom she owed money. The producer/director of Debbie Does Dallas, Jim Clark, said he created the stage name "Bambi Woods" in an allusion to the Disney character: "I named her Bambi Woods. There wasn't any real reason behind it. Bambi ... a deer. In the woods. Do you want to get deeper?" One reviewer in a TV documentary about the film expressed the opinion that Woods' demeanor during sex scenes was in keeping with her pseudonym, being reminiscent of a deer caught in car headlights.

Woods' adult-entertainment career occurred towards the end of the Golden Age of Porn, when the filmmakers operated in a legal gray area, making them vulnerable to extortion by organized criminals who controlled distribution. At the time, there were no laws requiring mandatory verification and record keeping of participants’ true identities and ages, and the real names of even the most prolific actors remained unknown outside their profession until decades later, when the identities of almost all famous performers were circulated on the Internet. Despite the huge profits being made, female performers’ fees rarely exceeded the low hundreds of dollars. Although Woods ostensibly performed in Debbie Does Dallas as a one-off to clear a debt, she spent all her earnings, so the still-owed friend arranged for her to become an exotic dancer. An interviewer, told about the background to Woods' career, remarked of the creditor that she had "a heart of gold".

The film became a huge success. According to one account, and interviews she gave, Woods was feted in New York City clubs, including Studio 54 and Plato's Retreat, and mixed with celebrities. However, she was distraught when a level of publicity she had not anticipated led to her family's discovery of her career in pornography. She also became increasingly disillusioned with approbation as a porn star and disconcerted by being sought by those bringing a civil suit.

Two years after her pornographic debut, she had not made another film. She did not have sex on camera for any production she is credited with subsequent to 1981; these may have used clips years after they were filmed. Woods disappeared completely from the public eye by the mid-1980s.

Disappearance
A 2005 article in the Australian newspaper The Age stated that Woods had died in 1986 of a drug overdose under lurid circumstances. In a 2005 Channel 4 documentary, Debbie Does Dallas Uncovered, Clark said the real name of Woods, which he declined to specify on camera, was used to trace her family in the mid-1990s and a private investigator had been informed through indirect communications that she was living an ordinary life in the Des Moines, Iowa area and wished to have no further involvement with, nor publicity concerning, her former career. A woman who claimed to be Woods came forward in 2007, disputing most of the claims in Debbie Does Dallas Uncovered in an interview she conducted solely by e-mail. The only thing that her account and Uncovered agreed upon was that she was living an ordinary life and wanted nothing to do with her pornographic past. The interviewer could not verify whether it was the real Woods.

See also

List of people who disappeared

References

External links

1955 births
20th-century American actresses
American pornographic film actresses
Unidentified people
Living people